CJRT-FM (91.1 MHz) is a Canadian public radio station and charitable arts organization in Toronto, Ontario, known as JAZZ.FM91. The studios are on Pardee Avenue in the Liberty Village neighbourhood of Toronto. The station describes itself as Canada's only 24-hour all-jazz radio station, with evening and weekend specialty shows devoted to jazz-influenced R&B, blues, big band and Latin jazz. It has a professional staff of on-air hosts, with more than 90 volunteers assisting. It is listener-supported and holds periodic on-air fundraisers, seeking donations to support the station.

CJRT-FM has an effective radiated power (ERP) of 40,000 watts. Its transmitter is atop the CN Tower. 

The station is simulcast on Bell Satellite TV channel 960, Rogers NextBox channel 933, and Shaw Direct channel 869.

JAZZ.FM91 is a registered charity that provides youth programs, workshops, internships and scholarships in partnership with educational institutions and other arts organizations.

History

Origins
In 1949, Ryerson Institute of Technology (now Toronto Metropolitan University) received CBC approval to operate an educational FM station in Toronto (88.3 MHz - 3,000 watts).

On April 6, 1964, the licensee name was changed to The Board of Governors of Ryerson Polytechnical Institute (as it was then known), and CJRT-FM became a professionally staffed radio service, with the broadcast schedule increased from 7am to midnight seven days a week. There was still some student training but that ended a few years later. Future Station Manager Cam Finley joined the station in December.  It played classical, jazz, and folk music, with educational and public affairs programming, children's shows, and comedy from the BBC.

Independence
In 1973, Ryerson, announced its intention to surrender the broadcast licence of CJRT-FM due to financial restraints. By now the station had achieved somewhat of a profile and the story reached the press. After a large public outcry, a year later in 1974, Ontario Premier Bill Davis announced that the provincial legislature would pass legislation to create an independent corporation to run the station and buy the license. On November 29, CJRT-FM INC. was incorporated by Ontario Letters Patent and CJRT-FM was transferred from Ryerson Polytechnical Institute to the new non-profit corporation. The station received money from the Ontario government and from companies and listeners through fundraising. Cam Finley was appointed Acting Manager in 1973, General Manager in 1974 and President and GM in 1979. John Valentyn launched a weekly blues program. Bud Riley joined CJRT as news and public affairs director.

In co-operation with Ryerson and York University's Atkinson College, CJRT offered several on-air Open College courses from 1971 to 2003. In 2003, the service was transferred to Ryerson's G. Raymond Chang School of Continuing Education, which offers distance education through the internet, print, and recorded media rather than on radio. In its last years, Open College broadcasts aired Sunday mornings from 6am to 8am.

Following Ryerson's loss of ownership of CJRT in 1974, CKLN-FM was licensed as Ryerson's campus radio station from 1983 to 2011 followed by CJRU since 2016.

In 1975, Glen Woodcock began hosting The Big Band Show, which is still running more than 45 years later.

New format 
In January 2001, the station quietly switched to an all-jazz format and rebranded as JAZZ.FM91. In 2004 Ross Porter, whose weeknight jazz programs on CBC Radio had made him a national name, and who later helped CanWest launch COOL-TV and Cool.FM radio, was hired to replace Chuck Camroux in July, as President and CEO

Two years later, after nearly 14 years occupying Ryerson property at 150 Mutual Street, CJRT moved to its current street-front facilities at 4 Pardee Ave. in the Liberty Village neighbourhood of Toronto. By this point, the station had added several more on-air personalities including Terry McElligott, Ralph Benmergui, Heather Bambrick, Bill King, Jaymz Bee, Walter Venafro, Reiner Schwarz, Amanda Martinez, many remain with the station to this day.

Leadership change
Then-president and CEO Ross Porter stepped down as CEO in June of 2018, following an investigation into allegations of workplace misconduct and creating a toxic work environment. Charles Cutts, former president and CEO of the Corporation of Massey Hall and Roy Thomson Hall, was appointed interim CEO.  

A short time later, the station cut four hosts - Jaymz Bee, Mark Wigmore, Walter Venafro and David Basskin. David Wall, director of community outreach and education, and two other employees were also affected. There was also a shake up at the boardroom level. Chair Renah Persofsky was replaced by David McGown.In December of 2018 long time Midday host Terry McElligott resigned his position at the station.

The turmoil resulted in the departure of a number of on-air staff and a decline in donations to the station. At the end of 2018 a group of JAZZ.FM91 donors formed a group called “Save JAZZFM” and launched a campaign to hold an extraordinary meeting of the charity’s membership. Following a Ontario Court ruling granting access to the membership contact information to the Save JAZZFM under the leadership of Brian Hemming. A sufficient proportion of the membership signed a petition requiring the Board of Directors to call the extraordinary meeting to overturn the station's board of directors. A general meeting of the membership held on February 15, 2019, succeeded in removing the board by a vote of 446 to 435, electing a new board composed of the dissident group.  

Lorie Russell, Vice President and Managing Director of JAZZ.FM91 announced in September 2020 that she would be leaving the station in mid-December. Former JAZZ.FM Director of Sales and Marketing Dana Wigle returned to the station as General Manager.,  Under new management, JAZZ.FM91 won several broadcasting awards and expanded its digital presence with the addition of podcasts, specialty channels and virtual concerts.

Awards and honors 
 Silver award, The Sound of Jazz, New York Festivals Radio Awards, 2018
 Silver award, Music to Listen to Jazz By with Ross Porter, New York Festivals Radio Awards, 2018
 Gold award, The Journey to Jazz and Human Rights, New York Festivals Radio Awards, 2020
 Winner, Campus or Community Station of the Year, Canadian Radio Awards, 2021
 Winner, Sound of Success Award, Canadian Radio Awards, 2021
 Finalist, Music Director of the Year, Canadian Radio Awards, 2021
 Finalist, Black History Month Vignettes, New York Festivals Radio Awards, 2021
 Finalist, The View From L.A., New York Festivals Radio Awards, 2021
 Winner, Best Radio Station, NOW Readers' Choice Poll, 2021
 Finalist, Best Radio Personality, NOW Readers' Choice Poll, 2021
 Gold award, Best Jazz Format, New York Festivals Radio Awards, 2022
 Finalist, Black History Month Vignettes, New York Festivals Radio Awards, 2022
 Finalist, Caribbean Christmas Mixtape, New York Festivals Radio Awards, 2022
 Finalist, In the Land of the Misty Giant, New York Festivals Radio Awards, 2022

See also
Ryerson Radio

References

External links
JAZZ.FM91
 

Jrt
Jrt
Public radio in Canada
Toronto Metropolitan University
Radio stations established in 1949
1949 establishments in Ontario